Urmary (Vărmar) is an urban-type settlement and the administrative center of Urmarsky District, the Chuvash Republic, Russia. Population:

References

Notes

Sources

Urban-type settlements in Chuvashia